At the 2009 East Asian Games, the athletics events were held at the Tseung Kwan O Sports Ground in Hong Kong from 10 December to 13 December. A total of 46 events were contested, of which 23 were by male athletes and 23 by female athletes.

China went on to win the most events, with Liu Qing winning golds in the 800 metres, 1500 metres and 4×400 metres relay races. Japan was a clear second place in the medals while South Korea and Chinese Taipei also took a double-digit medal haul. Athletes representing the hosts Hong Kong won seven bronze medals.

Records

Medal summary

Men

Women

Medal table

References
General
Results from Official 2009 Games website (archived)
Krishnan, Ram. Murali (2009-12-10). Japan and Korea prevent Chinese sweep - East Asian Games, Day 1. IAAF. Retrieved on 2013-03-17.
Krishnan, Ram. Murali (2009-12-11). Liu Xiang and Chinese throwers dominate - East Asian Games, Day 2. IAAF. Retrieved on 2013-03-17.
Krishnan, Ram. Murali (2009-12-12). China's Liu Qing completes double but overall it's Japan's day - East Asian Games, Day 3. IAAF. Retrieved on 2013-03-17.
Krishnan, Ram. Murali (2009-12-13). East Asian Games conclude. IAAF. Retrieved on 2013-03-17.

External links
Official website

Events at the 2009 East Asian Games
2009
East Asian Games
2009 East Asian Games